Juan Pablo Galavis Guinand (born August 5, 1981) is an American-born Venezuelan television personality and former professional soccer player. In 2013, he was chosen as the first  Latino  star of the ABC-TV reality show The Bachelor after 17 editions.

Early life and football career
Galavis was born in Ithaca, New York, to Venezuelan parents Saul Galavis and Nelly Guinand and is the second of three siblings, he moved with his family to Barquisimeto, Venezuela, when he was 2 years old. He returned to the United States to play soccer at Roberts Wesleyan College, where as of 2006 he was tied with two others for that team's third-highest number of assists (25).  After several seasons playing in the Primera División Venezolana with Dep. Italchacao, Monagas SC, Aragua FC and Guaros FC, he joined Miami FC in February 2008.

Entertainment career
He left football after his 2008 season with Miami and began his career in the music business with promotional work in the Miami bar and club scene. Around this time, he also began working with Venezuelan musician/songwriters Frank Santofimio and Mario Donoso. They began promoting Venezuelan duet Chino y Nacho.

Galavis began filming television commercials and had a short stint working as a television presenter for a Miami-based sports show, Mega TV's Mega News.

Galavís appeared as a contestant on the ABC reality-television dating competition The Bachelorette in May 2013, but was eliminated midway in the season. On August 5, 2013, ABC announced he would star in season 18 of The Bachelor, scheduled to premiere in January 2014. As a Latino, he was the first person from an ethnic minority to be chosen as bachelor after 17 previous editions.

After receiving a call from Daniel Morales in March 2016 and listened to his music, Galavis created a strategy to relaunch the artist, change his name, took down all his songs from the platforms and helped with the A&R and marketing. On Spe 16, 2016, Galavis released the song "Me Rehuso" and the English version "Baby I Won't",  where "Me Rehuso" became one of the biggest hits of 2017. The art cover music video has over 1B views, being one of the most viewed videos with only a cover art.

The song made a huge impact and helped Galavis and Daniel Morales known as Danny Ocean, sign a multi million record deal with Warner Music Latin and Atlantic Records. Also Juan Pablo helped Daniel close a deal with SonyATV on the publishing side.

Currently Juan Pablo Galavis is developing different artists, producers and writers with RedWine Management and created a sports division, RedWine Sports, where he represents soccer players.

Personal life
Galavis and his former girlfriend, Venezuelan actress Carla Rodríguez, have a daughter, born on February 14, 2009. He chose Nikki Ferrell on season 18 of The Bachelor, but the two ended their relationship in October 2014. In 2016, he began dating Venezuelan model and TV host Osmariel Villalobos. On August 7, 2017, it was announced that the two had married. In 2019, they divorced.

References

External links

Juan Pablo Galavis verified Twitter page

1981 births
Living people
Sportspeople from Barquisimeto
Sportspeople from Ithaca, New York
American sportspeople of Venezuelan descent
American soccer players
American expatriate soccer players
People with acquired Venezuelan citizenship
Venezuelan footballers
Roberts Wesleyan University alumni
Soccer players from New York (state)
Cascade Surge players
Caracas FC players
C.S. Marítimo de Venezuela players
Deportivo Italia players
Monagas S.C. players
Aragua FC players
Miami FC (2006) players
USL First Division players
USL League Two players
Association football midfielders
Bachelor Nation contestants
Guaros F.C. players